Coppereid, also known as White Cloud City is a ghost town in Churchill County, Nevada. It had a total population of 40 people. The site of Coppereid is south of Lovelock, east of the Carson Sink in the Stillwater Range.

Geography 
Coppereid is approximately 2,000 feet north and 2,400 feet west of the southeast corner of Nevada.

Soil 
Coppereid has very soft, shallow, and well drained soils. They are found on mountain slopes. They are mostly dry throughout the year, except for Winter, where they become moist.

History 
From 1893 to 1896, a small copper smelter was in operation.

Coppereid was named after John T. Reid.  Coppereid had a post office from April 1907 to June 1914.

On December 2nd, 1909, Fallon became the supply for the site due to the fact that it was closer than Lovelock.

External links
 White Cloud City (Coppereid) at GhostTowns.com
 Coppereid at Forgottennevada.com

References

Ghost towns in Churchill County, Nevada
Ghost towns in Nevada